Armand Salvador B. Mijares is a Filipino archaeologist from Manila, Philippines. He works as Professor of Archaeology at the Archaeological Studies Program of the University of the Philippines-Diliman. He specializes in lithic analysis, ceramic petrology, soil micromorphology, paleolithic archaeology and early human migration in Southeast Asia. In 2010, Mijares gained international attention as the main author of a Journal of Human Evolution report about a 67,000-year old foot bone discovered in Callao Cave. That report gave evidence for the newly named species of Homo, called Homo luzonensis, named after the Philippines' largest island—Luzon. The discovery has  advanced the complexity of early human  colonization of Southeast Asia.

Education
Mijares earned his Bachelor of Arts in Development Studies from the University of the Philippines Manila and his Master of Arts in Anthropology at the University of the Philippines Diliman. In 1996, he did his Diploma in Archaeology at UP-Diliman's newly established Archaeological Studies Program and went on with a Fulbright Scholarship to pursue his Master of Science in Anthropology major in Archaeology at the University of New Mexico in 2001. He finished his PhD in Archaeology and Palaeoanthropology at the Australian National University under the tutelage  of Peter Bellwood in 2006

Career
After he received his Master's degree, he  taught at the University of the Philippines Manila. Afterwards  he pursued archaeological research work at the National Museum of the Philippines in 1994 , and worked as an archaeologist in the museum until 2006. After earning his Ph.D., Mijares returned to  University of the Philippines-Diliman where he now does his archeological research as Professor at the  Archaeological Studies Program.

He is a member of the editorial board of World Archaeology journal.

Research
Mijares' research primarily focuses on understanding early human migration in Maritime Southeast Asia. He is also interested in reconstructing hunter-gatherer subsistence strategy during the Late Pleistocene and early Holocene period through thorough excavations in Northern Luzon, especially in Callao Cave Complex, where the earliest human remains in the Philippines (67kya), was found. He is also leading an archaeological research in the island of Mindoro which has been in collaboration with other specialists and colleagues, both local and international, in order to reconstruct past human movements. Mijares' area of specialization is on lithic analysis, ceramic petrology, soil micromorphology, early human migration and Palaeolithic archaeology.

Homo luzonensis 
Mijares and his team found the bones of two adults and a child, from a previously unknown human-related species now called Homo luzonensis and previously known as the Callao Man.

The hominin fossils and teeth are from three individuals and were collectively nicknamed 'Ubag', after a mythical cave man that were excavated in 2007, 2011 and 2015. The Internationally pooled team of specialists and archaeologists consist of paleoanthropologist Florent Détroit of the Muséum national d’Histoire naturelle, zooarchaeologist Philip Piper of Australian National University, and geochronologist Rainer Grün of Griffith University, dug up the hominin fossils from a sedimentary level located three meters below the current surface of the cave floor. Through uranium-series dating, the bones were found to be 50 to 67 thousand years old—making them the earliest human remains to be discovered in the Philippines

References 

1966 births
Living people
People from Manila
Filipino archaeologists
Academic staff of the University of the Philippines Diliman
University of the Philippines Diliman alumni
University of the Philippines Manila alumni